This is a list of Maltese football transfers for the 2011–12 summer transfer window by club. Only transfers of clubs in the Maltese Premier League and Maltese First Division are included.

The summer transfer window opened on 1 July 2011, although a few transfers may take place prior to that date. The window closed at midnight on 31 August 2011. Players without a club may join one at any time, either during or in between transfer windows.

Maltese Premier League

Balzan Youths

In:

Out:

Birkirkara

In:

Out:

Floriana

In:

 

Out:

Ħamrun Spartans

In:

Out:

Hibernians

In:

Out:

Marsaxlokk

In:

 

Out:

Mosta

In:

Out:

Mqabba

In:

Out:

Qormi

In:

Out:

Sliema Wanderers

In:

Out:

Tarxien Rainbows

In:

Out:

Valletta

In:

Out:

Maltese First Division

Birzebbuga St.Peters

In:

Out:

Dingli Swallows

In:

Out:

Lija Athletic

In:

Out:

Melita

In:

Out:

Naxxar Lions

In:

Out:

Pietà Hotspurs

In:

Out:

Rabat Ajax

In:

Out:

St. Andrews

In:

Out:

St. George's

In:

Out:

St. Patrick

In:

Out:

Vittoriosa Stars

In:

 

Out:

Zejtun Corinthians

In:

Out:

Manager Transfers

See also
 List of Dutch football transfers summer 2011
 List of English football transfers summer 2011
 List of French football transfers summer 2011
 List of German football transfers summer 2011
 List of Italian football transfers summer 2011
 List of Portuguese football transfers summer 2011
 List of Spanish football transfers summer 2011
 List of Swedish football transfers summer 2011

References

External links
 Official Website

Maltese
Transfers
2011